Sacha McNeil is a New Zealand journalist and news presenter, She presented TV3 program Nightline from 2011 to 2013. She previously presented Firstline alongside Michael Wilson.

McNeil has been a TV reporter and presenter since 1999, including appearing in One News, Breakfast and Tonight shows, before joining the 3 News and Sunrise teams in August 2007, where she worked alongside her father Bob McNeil.

McNeil presented the news on early morning programme Sunrise till 2010 and then became presenter of the 3 News Midday bulletin. She then later became a presenter for Nightline. She gave birth to a girl in 2009.

McNeil left her presenting position in 2011 on maternity leave, with Ingrid Hipkiss filling in. She gave birth to her second child in 2012 and returned to presenting Nightline in April 2012.

In December 2013 it was announced that McNeil would present early morning news programme Firstline alongside Michael Wilson in 2014, following Nightline's cancellation.

See also
 List of New Zealand television personalities

References

Living people
New Zealand television journalists
New Zealand women journalists
New Zealand television presenters
New Zealand women television presenters
Year of birth missing (living people)